Zinke is a German surname. Notable people with the surname include:

Annelore Zinke (born 1958), German gymnast
Charlotte Zinke (1891–1944), German politician 
Clara Louise Zinke (1909–1978), American tennis player
Gustav Zinke (1891–1967), Czechoslovak rower
Heiko Zinke, German sprint canoeist
Olaf Zinke (born 1966), German former speed skater
Ryan Zinke (born 1961), United States Secretary of the Interior

See also
Zincke, a surname
Zink (disambiguation)

German-language surnames